Reggie Perry may refer to:

Syience, American songwriter
Reggie Perry (basketball) (born 2000), American basketball player
Reggie Perry (Canadian football) (born 1970), Canadian football wide receiver